A Moreninha may refer to:

 A Moreninha (novel), an 1844 novel by Joaquim Manuel de Macedo
 A Moreninha (TV series), a 1965 Brazilian telenovela